HMS Monarch was an 84-gun second rate ship of the line of the Royal Navy, launched on 18 December 1832 at Chatham Dockyard.

She was used as a target ship from 1862, and broken up in 1866.

Notes

References

Lavery, Brian (2003) The Ship of the Line - Volume 1: The development of the battlefleet 1650-1850. Conway Maritime Press. .

External links
 

Ships of the line of the Royal Navy
Canopus-class ships of the line
Ships built in Chatham
1832 ships
Crimean War naval ships of the United Kingdom